Glauco Vanz (4 March 1920 – 28 September 1986) was an Italian footballer. He played in more than 180 matches for Bologna between 1938 and 1952. He was also part of Italy's squad for the football tournament at the 1948 Summer Olympics, but he did not play in any matches.

References

External links
 

1920 births
1986 deaths
Italian footballers
Place of birth missing
Association football goalkeepers
Mantova 1911 players
S.S.C. Bari players
Bologna F.C. 1909 players
Giulianova Calcio players